Ringwood East railway station is located on the Lilydale line in Victoria, Australia. It serves the eastern Melbourne suburb of Ringwood East, and it opened on 18 May 1925.

In 1975, the present station building was provided.

On 30 June 1984, the current island platform was provided, as part of the duplication of the line between Ringwood and Croydon. Boom barriers were provided at the Dublin Road level crossing, located nearby in the Up direction of the station, in that same year.

On 29 July 2021, the Level Crossing Removal Project announced that the level crossing will be grade separated by 2025, with a rail trench to be built underneath the road. The level crossing removal will also involve the construction of a new station.

Platforms and services

Ringwood East has one island platform with two faces. The station is located in Myki Zone 2. The station is located between Railway Avenue and Patterson Street in the centre of Ringwood East, and has 330 car parking spaces.

It is serviced by Metro Trains' Lilydale line services.

Platform 1:
  all stations and limited express services to Flinders Street; all stations shuttle services to Ringwood

Platform 2:
  all stations services to Lilydale

Transport links

Kinetic Melbourne operates one route via Ringwood East station, under contract to Public Transport Victoria:
 : Ringwood – Croydon Loop. Stops include Ringwood and Croydon stations.

References

External links
 
 Station information at Metro
 Route information at PTV 
 Melway map at street-directory.com.au

Railway stations in Melbourne
Railway stations in Australia opened in 1925
Railway stations in the City of Maroondah
Ringwood, Victoria